Conus tristensis is a species of sea snail, a marine gastropod mollusk in the family Conidae, the cone snails, cone shells or cones.

These snails are predatory and venomous. They are capable of "stinging" humans.

Description
Original description: "Shell stocky with compressed body, wide across shoulder and tapering rapidly toward anterior end; shoulder sharply angled, slightly carinated; spire low, flattened; body whorl sculptured with 18 prominent, raised spiral cords; spiral cords pustulated; spire whorls sculptured with six incised spiral sulci; shell color pure white with small, scattered pale orange-brown flammules; spire whorls with regularly-spaced, amorphous brown flammules; early whorls pale orange; periostracum thick, with rows of erect hairs that correspond to raised, pustulated cords on body whorl."

The size of the shell varies between 29 mm and 37 mm.

Distribution
Locus typicus: "Off Tucacas, Carabobo, Golfo de Triste, Venezuela."

This marine species occurs in the Caribbean Sea off Colombia and Venezuela.

References

 Tucker J.K. & Tenorio M.J. (2013) Illustrated catalog of the living cone shells. 517 pp. Wellington, Florida: MdM Publishing.

External links
 To World Register of Marine Species
 Gastropods.com:  Conasprelloides cancellatus var. tristensis

tristensis
Gastropods described in 1987